Anthonia Kehinde Fatunsin is a Nigerian archaeologist. She is regarded as Nigeria's first female archaeologist, and the first woman to head National museum of Ibadan. Her fieldwork has been centered mostly on yoruba pottery, particularly from Owo community.

Archaeological excavations 
In 1981, Fatunsin began excavating Igbo'laja and Ijebu-Owo site in Owo town to discover what was known as Owo terracotta. Babasehinde Ademuleya from Obafemi Awolowo University noted that her examination was the second time that the town was being excavated after the 1976 visit of Ekpo Eyo. However, Fatunsin is observed to be the first to give a comprehensive description to the characteristics of the sculptures.

Museological career 
Fatunshin has written about the role of archaeology in Nigerian museums and the impact of it on cultural heritage in the country. She has been recognised as a pioneer of postcolonial archaeological thought and interpretation in Africa.

References 

Living people
Nigerian women archaeologists
Nigerian women scientists
Year of birth missing (living people)
20th-century archaeologists
21st-century archaeologists
20th-century women scientists
21st-century women scientists
Nigerian archaeologists